Michaelpatty Raja is a 2021 Indian Tamil-language comedy-drama film directed by Francis S and produced by Spellbound Films Inc. The film features Nikesh Ram and Perlene Bhesania in the lead roles, with Rajendran, Kovai Sarala and Thambi Ramaiah in supporting roles. The film had a theatrical release on 19 March 2021.

Plot 
Raja is forced to travel to Dubai to work as a driver, after being sent out from his village by his father due to irresponsible behavior. When Raja arrives in Dubai, he realizes that he cannot drive in Dubai without having a valid driving license from Dubai. He was informed by his agent that he could drive in Dubai with his Indian driving license.

After coming to know that he was cheated, he starts working in camel farm. He saves money and takes a Dubai driving license in due course. He gets a job with an Arab family, where everyone speaks Arabic or English, which he finds difficult. One midnight, a female ghost appears in his room, and starts to speak in Tamil.

Cast 
 Nikesh Ram as Raja
 Perlene Bhesania
 Rajendran as Naidu
 Thambi Ramaiah as a black magician
 Kovai Sarala as Raja's mother
 Ravi Mariya as Raja's brother-in-law
 Kausalya
 R. Sundarrajan as Raja's father

Production 
The film was first reported in early 2017 under the title of Arabu Thaaku, with Francis announced as the debut director and Nikesh Ram as the lead actor. The film was partially inspired by real events which had taken place in 2012. The title was later changed to Michaelpatty Rasavum Dubai Rosavum before Michaelpatty Raja was finalised.

In April 2017, the producers announced that Turkish actress Bergüzar Korel would play the lead role in the film, but she eventually did not feature. She was later replaced by Indian actress Perlene Bhesania. The film was predominantly shot in Dubai, with a number of Arabic and Pakistani actors based in Dubai also starring in the film.

Release and reception 
The film had a theatrical release across Tamil Nadu on 19 March 2021.

A reviewer from the newspaper Maalaimalar gave the film a mixed review. A reviewer from the news portal Ara Murasu noted that the film was "fun".

References 

2021 comedy-drama films
2020s Tamil-language films
2021 films
Fictional portrayals of the Tamil Nadu Police
Films based on Indian folklore
Films set in Chennai
Films set in Mumbai
Films shot in Chennai
Indian comedy-drama films
Indian films with live action and animation
Indian nonlinear narrative films